Darryl Rhoades (born June 7, 1950) is an American musician and comedian.

Early life and education

Rhoades is from Louisville, Kentucky. He attended high school in Forest Park, Georgia, a suburb south of Atlanta.

Career
Rhoades' musical career began in 1968 when he was a senior in high school as the drummer in a cover band, Celestial Voluptuous Banana, that played the Catacombs and Piedmont Park along with other bands such as the Hampton Grease Band. By 1975 he had formed the Hahavishnu Orchestra, a 12-piece musical comedy troupe which performed nationally until 1978. The music of the Orchestra is often compared to The Fugs, Frank Zappa and even The Tubes. The group's name is wordplay on the name of John McLaughlin's 1970s jazz fusion group The Mahavishnu Orchestra.

During this period, Kurt Loder (of Rolling Stone and later also MTV) was quoted proclaiming Rhoades as "one of the most savagely gifted writer/performers in the country today".

On New Year's Eve 1977, Rhoades and the orchestra appeared on the James Brown Future Shock television show on fledgling WTBS. In January 1978, Rhoades performed with the opening act for the American debut of the Sex Pistols. Rhoades' first LP, Burgers From Heaven, was released in 1979. Its title song appears in the Jim Varney film, Fast Food (1988).  Rhoades performed the title song on the now cult classic Bill Tush WTBS late-night comedy sketch show Tush during 1980–81 in the early days of cable television. The music was performed as the Idolators on Georgia Championship Wrestling as the ring music for wrestler Austin Idol.  The Outlaws recorded a cover of Rhoades' "The Lights Are On (But Nobody's Home)" on the 1979 album In The Eye of the Storm.

Although the period 1981–1984 is obscure for Rhoades, by 1985, he assembled The Men from Glad and released his second LP, Better Dead Than Mellow. In 1989, Rhoades began his comedy career.

In 1991 he released Before and After His Time, a compilation of his first three albums. In 1992 he released his fifth album, Cowpokin' & Udder Love Songs, which received airplay across the US.

Working continuously and receiving airplay from syndicated radio shows such as [[The Dr. Demento Show]] and The John Boy & Billy Big Show helped to create a large fanbase, leaving little time for Rhoades to perform with musical groups. He performs on rare occasions as the drummer for The Electrifyin' Sissies, which include record producer Brendan O'Brien, Rick Richards from the Georgia Satellites, and radio personality/rock historian Rex Patton.

In 1994 he released his sixth LP, The Lean Years 1950–1994. The album received even more airplay with his infamous U Suck Beer commercials which have become his trademark in his stand-up performances. In April 1999 he released his seventh LP titled Radio Daze...The Shroud of Tourin'''. This CD is a parody of radio deejays from all over the US, with satire of bad gospel music, commercials, and unfunny morning radio shows. Close to 40 different performers appear on the album.

In May 2001, Rhoades released Rhoades....All Over The Map, his eighth comedy and music recording. As its title alludes, the album contains various musical styles such as jazz, country, swing, heavy metal, rockabilly and more. Also, on this CD are versions of a couple of his songs recorded live in a rare radio interview and recorded live stand-up from the Punchline comedy club in Atlanta.

In 2008, Rhoades released his eleventh CD Weapons of Mass Deception which features Peter Stroud and Tim Smith (Sheryl Crow Band), Rick Richards (Georgia Satellites), Col. Bruce Hampton (multiple legendary groups and the film Slingblade) Deborah Reece (former Randall Bramblett band member) and other southern musicians.

On September 12, 2009, Rhoades regrouped many of the original members of the Hahavishnu Orchestra for a celebration at the Variety Playhouse in Atlanta. Also in 2009, Rhoades played drums in the Santa Fe scenes in the 2010 academy winning movie, Crazy Heart.

In 2014 Rhoades released another album, Teenagers in Heat, that is part sketch comedy, part social satire, part rock 'n' roll scrapbook.

Discography
 Burgers From Heaven, 1980
 Better Dead Than Mellow, 1985
 No Glove / No Love, 1988
 Before & After His Time (compilation), 1991
 Cowpokin & Udder Love Songs, 1992
 The Lean Years 1950–1994, 1994
 Radio Daze...The Shroud of Tourin', 1999
 Rhoades...All Over The Map, 2001
 The Shadow You Cast (Depends on Where You Stand), 2003
 Raparations, 2005
 Weapons of Mass Deception, 2008
 Teenagers in Heat'', 2015

Also recorded with
 Reverend Billy C. Wirtz
 Chip Taylor & The Idolators

See also
 Frank Zappa
 The Fugs
 The Tubes
 Outlaws
 Reverend Billy C. Wirtz
 Bill Tush

References

External links
 
 
 

1950 births
Living people
Musicians from Louisville, Kentucky
American male composers
21st-century American composers
American male comedians
21st-century American comedians
American male singers
Songwriters from Kentucky
Singers from Kentucky
21st-century American male musicians
American male songwriters